DBH [probably vocalized Azaba or Adhebah] (fl. 3rd century) was a king of Aksum, in the territory of modern-day North Ethiopia and Eritrea, who ruled c. 230–240. He and his son GRMT (possibly vocalized as "Girmai") are known through South Arabian inscriptions which mention Shamir, king of Dhu-Raydan and Himyar asking for his help against the Sabaean kings.

References

Kings of Axum
2nd-century births
3rd-century monarchs in Africa
Year of birth unknown
Place of birth unknown
Year of death unknown
Place of death unknown